Denis Forest (September 5, 1960 – March 18, 2002) was a Canadian character actor.

He was known for portraying henchmen in Academy Award-nominated blockbusters The Mask and Cliffhanger. He was the lead villain in the second season of the War of the Worlds television series.

Forest died suddenly following a massive stroke in Los Angeles on March 18, 2002, after having dinner in a Franklin Avenue restaurant in Hollywood with a few friends.

Filmography
The Adventures of Bob & Doug McKenzie: Strange Brew (1983) - Policeman
Head Office (1985) - Rich
The Climb (1986) - Hermann Kollensperger
Friday the 13th: The Series (1987-1990, TV series) - 4 episodes
The Tadpole and the Whale (1988) - Marcel
Lonely Child: The Imaginary World of Claude Vivier (1988) - Claude Vivier - Age 26
Destiny to Order (1989) - Chicout
The Long Road Home (1989) - Michael Posen
Wedlock (1991) - Puce
Cliffhanger (1993) - Heldon
The Mask (1994) - Sweet Eddy
New Crime City (1994) - Wizard
Where Truth Lies (1996) - Jonas Kellar
Eraser (1996) - Technician
Dead Men Can't Dance (1997) - Dennis Larson
Storm of the Century (1999) - Kirk Freeman
Hidden Agenda (1999) - Christoph
The X-Files (TV series) (Season 9 Ep. 10 - "Providence") (2002) - Zeke Josepho
Detonator (2003) - Steve Kerwin (final film role)

External links

A Tribute to Denis Forest

1960 births
2002 deaths
20th-century Canadian male actors
Canadian male film actors
Canadian male stage actors
Canadian male television actors
Male actors from Ottawa